Folklore (born 2003) is a retired American Thoroughbred racing filly. In 2005, she won the Breeders' Cup Juvenile Fillies and won an Eclipse Award for champion juvenile filly of 2005. She won the Matron Stakes by fourteen lengths and finished third in the Santa Ynez Stakes in her only start as a three-year-old. She fractured her knee in 2006 which caused her early retirement.

Pedigree

 indicates inbreeding

References

2003 racehorse births
Thoroughbred family 1-x
Racehorses trained in the United States
Racehorses bred in Kentucky
Breeders' Cup Juvenile Fillies winners
Godolphin Arabian sire line